Nebrius is a genus of carpet sharks in the family Ginglymostomatidae.

It contains a single extant species, the tawny nurse shark (Nebrius ferrugineus), as well as a number of extinct species dating back to the Early Paleocene.

See also
 
 List of prehistoric cartilaginous fish

References

Ginglymostomatidae
Shark genera
Paleocene sharks
Paleogene sharks
Neogene sharks
Quaternary sharks
Danian first appearances
Taxa named by Eduard Rüppell
Extant Danian first appearances